The Runaway Express is a 1926 American silent action film directed by Edward Sedgwick and starring Jack Dougherty, Blanche Mehaffey and Tom O'Brien.

Cast
 Jack Dougherty as Joseph Foley 
 Blanche Mehaffey as Nora Kelly 
 Tom O'Brien as Sandy McPherson 
 Charles K. French as Jim Reed 
 William Steel as Blackie McPherson
 Harry Todd as Dad Hamilton 
 Madge Hunt as Mrs. Foley 
 Syd Saylor as The Tramp

References

Bibliography
 Munden, Kenneth White. The American Film Institute Catalog of Motion Pictures Produced in the United States, Part 1. University of California Press, 1997.

External links

1926 films
1920s action films
American action films
American silent feature films
1920s English-language films
Universal Pictures films
Films directed by Edward Sedgwick
American black-and-white films
Silent action films
1920s American films